Manilkara huberi, also known as masaranduba, níspero, and sapotilla, is a fruit bearing plant of the genus Manilkara of the family Sapotaceae.

Geographical distribution

Description
The flowers are hermaphroditic; white with 3 sepals. The edible fruit is yellow and ovoid,  in diameter, containing one seed (or occasionally two).

Uses
The fruit of the M. huberi is similar to the sapodilla and is edible, with excellent flavor popular for use in desserts.

M. huberi produces an edible latex that can be harvested in a manner similar to the harvesting of the latex of the rubber tree (Hevea brasiliensis).  The latex dries to an inelastic rubber, which is considered inferior to gutta-percha.

The latex from M. huberi is sometimes used to make golf ball covers.  It is considered a good, but short-lived, cover, requiring frequent recoating, yet it is popular in tournaments.

The tree is also used for lumber in Puerto Rico.  The wood is red and very hard, and is popular for use in furniture making, construction, and railway ties.  The wood is so dense to the point that it does not float on water, and requires pre-drilling before nailing.  The specific gravity of M. huberi wood is between 0.85 and 0.95 g/cm3.

Synonyms
Manilkara huberi is also known as:
 Manilkara jaimiqui C. Wright ex Griseb.; Dubard 
 Mimusops huberi Ducke
 Mimusops jaimiqui C. Wright ex Griseb.

References

huberi
Plants described in 1833